Charles Blair Leighton (6 March 1823 – 6 February 1855) was an English painter. He was the father of painter Edmund Blair Leighton (1853–1922).

Biography
Charles Leighton was born to Stephen Leighton and Helen Blair. He was apprenticed to a silver-engraver between ages 14–21 but abandoned engraving and became a student of the Royal Academy. He painted portraits and figure-pieces, and was an occasional exhibitor at the Royal Academy.

He married Caroline Boosey, daughter of music publisher Thomas Boosey, in April 1849 and they had two daughters and a son (the painter Edmund Blair Leighton).

He died on 6 February 1855, aged 31.

References

Notes

1823 births
1855 deaths
19th-century English painters
English male painters
19th-century English male artists